Yoruba Americans are Americans of Yoruba descent. The Yoruba people  are a West African ethnic group that predominantly inhabits southwestern Nigeria, with  smaller indigenous communities in Benin and Togo.

History 

The first Yoruba people who arrived to the United States were imported as slaves from Nigeria and Benin during the Atlantic slave trade. This ethnicity of the slaves was one of the main origins of present-day Nigerians who arrived to the United States, along with the Igbo. In addition, native slaves of current Benin hailed from peoples such as Nago, Ewe, Fon and Gen. Many of the slaves imported to the modern United States from Benin were sold by the King of Dahomey, in Whydah.  

The slaves brought with them their cultural practices, languages, cuisine and religious beliefs rooted in spirit and ancestor worship. So, the manners of the Yoruba, Fon, Gen and Ewe of Benin were key elements of Louisiana Voodoo.  Also Haitians, who migrated to Louisiana in the late nineteenth century and also contributed to Voodoo of this state, have the Yoruba Fon, and Ewe among their main origins.

Cuban immigrants brought with them the Santería religion, a child of the Yoruba religion and Roman Catholicism. Born in 1903 in Cuba, he immigrated to NYC in 1946, took the name Padrino, and began practicing as a babalawo.

On May 23rd, 1980 the city's animal health authorities raided the apartment of one of Padrino's followers on East 146th Street in the Bronx. The American Society for the Prevention of Cruelty to Animals (ASPCA) had complained about Santería's practices of animal sacrifice. Three goats and eighteen chickens were removed from the dwelling.

The Yoruba, and some northern Nigerian ethnic groups, had tribal facial identification marks. These could have assisted a returning slave in relocating his or her ethnic group, but few slaves escaped the colonies. In the colonies, masters tried to dissuade the practice of tribal customs. They also sometimes mixed people of different ethnic groups to make it more difficult for them to communicate and bond together in rebellion. Today, most African Americans share ancestry with the Yoruba people.

After the slavery abolition in 1865, many modern Nigerian immigrants of Yoruba ancestry have come to the United States starting in the mid-twentieth century to pursue educational opportunities in undergraduate and post-graduate institutions. President Lyndon B. Johnson signed the Immigration and Nationality Act of 1965, which allowed for a significant number of Nigerians of Yoruba ancestry to immigrate to the United States.  During the 1960s and 1970s, after the Nigerian-Biafran War, Nigeria's government funded scholarships for Nigerian students, and many of them were admitted to American universities. While this was happening, there were several military coups and brief periods of civilian rule. All this caused many Nigerians to emigrate.  Most of these Nigerian immigrants are of Yoruba, Igbo and Ibibio origins.

Yorubas have often found American habits of pet keeping very strange, culturally unfamiliar.

List of Yoruba Americans 

Cudjoe Lewis, one of the last known survivors of the Atlantic slave trade
Matilda McCrear, one of the last known survivors of the Atlantic slave trade
Scipio Vaughan, slave
Brendon Ayanbadejo, football player
Femi Emiola, actress
Lola Ogunnaike, entertainment journalist
Angélique Kidjo, singer
Adewale Ogunleye, football player
Toyin Falola, historian
Oluwatoyin Asojo, biochemist
Hakeem Olajuwon, basketball player
Oye Owolewa, politician
Wale, rapper
Kehinde Wiley, artist
Harold Demuren, aeronautical engineer
Oshoke Abalu, architect and futurist
Toluse Olorunnipa, political commentator
Abiola Irele, literary scholar
Babatunde Ogunnaike, chemical engineer
Ilesanmi Adesida, physicist
Akintunde Akinwande, electrical engineer
Kamaru Usman, mixed martial arts fighter
Chamillionaire, rapper
Tomi Adeyemi, novelist
Wally Adeyemo, United States Deputy Secretary of the Treasury
Luvvie Ajayi, blogger
David Oyelowo, actor
Dot da Genius, music producer
Tanitoluwa Adewumi, chess player
Deji Akinwande, electrical and computer engineering professor
Akinwumi Ogundiran, archaeologist
Bamidele A. Ojo, political scientist
Kunle Olukotun, computer scientist
Mojisola Adeyeye pharmacist and professor
Fela Sowande, musician and composer
Nelson M. Oyesiku, neurosurgeon
Olufunmilayo Olopade, hematologist
Yewande Olubummo, mathematician
Kate Okikiolu, mathematician
Rick Famuyiwa, film director
Temie Giwa-Tubosun, entrepreneur
Folakemi T. Odedina, pharmacy professor
Bo Oshoniyi, soccer player
Sope Aluko, actress
Sade Baderinwa, news anchor
Folake Olowofoyeku, actress
Tunde Adebimpe, lead singer of TV on the Radio
Adebayo Ogunlesi, lawyer and investment banker
Jimmy Adegoke, climatologist
Dayo Okeniyi, actor
Arike Ogunbowale, basketball player
Benson Mayowa, football player
Bayo Ojikutu, creative writer
Adebayo Alonge, entrepreneur
Tosin Abasi, founder and lead guitarist of Animals as Leaders
Nelson M. Oyesiku, neurosurgeon
Lola Eniola-Adefeso, chemical engineer
Deborah Ayorinde, actress
Jacob K. Olupona,  scholar of indigenous African religions
Mobolaji Dawodu, fashion designer
Stephen Adebanji Akintoye, historian
Ade A. Olufeko, artist and technologist
Toyin Ojih Odutola, graphic artist
Esther Agbaje, attorney and politician
Abiodun Koya, classical opera singer
Ibiyinka Alao, architect
John Dabiri, aerospace engineer
Adewale Ogunleye, football player
Tobi Jnohope, footballer

See also 
African diaspora
 Odunde Festival
African American
Nigerian American
African Americans in Louisiana
Lucumi people
Yoruba Canadians
Afro-Jamaican
Afro-Puerto Rican
Afro-Cuban
Afro-Brazilian
Saros
Yoruba people
Yoruba language

Notes

References

External links

 
West Africans in the United States
 
Yoruba-American history
African-American society